Kasibhatta Brahmaiah Sastry (2 February 1863 – 29 October 1940) was a noted Sanskrit and Telugu scholar and who coined the term "Navala" in Telugu literature. He is an orthodox Brahmin scholar from Andhra pradesh. He was a great pandit well versed in Sanskrit and Telugu and an adept in writing critical literary essays in Telugu. He collected various religious Essays and Writings and  published in 1911 by the title of "Upanyasapayonidhi". He had already learned the English language by that lime, and embarked upon a serious study of Hinduism and Sastras. He started a journal "Rajayogi" in kakinada. He was editing a monthly journal by the title of Aryamatha Bodhini.

Early life and education
He was born on 2 February 1853 at Palivela village of East Godavari district. His parents are Subbamma and Brahmavadhani. In 1883, he started "Aryamathabodhini" at Kakinada. He started a library named "Vivekananda pustaka bhandagaram" affiliation to his sabha "Artyamathabodhini".

He was opposed to Viresa lingam Pantulu in all respects—in religious thought, social reform and literature. He was always on the alert to expose the loopholes in Viresalingam's writings and social reform activities.

References

External links
 Upanyasa Payonidhi book in wikimedia.org

1863 births
1940 deaths
Telugu writers
People from East Godavari district
Indian Sanskrit scholars
Scholars from Andhra Pradesh
19th-century Indian scholars
20th-century Indian scholars